UFC Personal Trainer: The Ultimate Fitness System is a fighting and fitness video game created by THQ. The game requires the Kinect accessory for the Xbox 360 version and the PlayStation Move and PlayStation Eye Camera for the PlayStation 3 version. There is also a Wii version that does not require any additional accessories to play.

Gameplay

The PlayStation 3 version is a fitness video game that has training instruction in three separate sections from three champion UFC fighters and trainers: Mark Delagrotte, Greg Jackson, and Javier Mendez. They start with a warm up, followed by stretching, and then the workout the player has selected from the menu under their section, ending with a cool down stretching period. Warm up and cool down are key phases of any UFC fighter's fitness regimen. In fact, some have claimed that Mark Delagrotte's loss to Thai-boxer Nigel Green was partially due to a lack of warm up and cool down during his fight camp.

The instructors give tips, instructions, and encouragement throughout the entire workout. There are also occasionally jokes such as when Javier Mendez asks if you "need time to wipe your tears" when you pause the game mid-workout. The player can work out alone or side-by-side with a partner. They need to plug in the PlayStation Eye Camera and calibrate the PlayStation Move before the disc will go to the menu screen. They will need the PlayStation Leg Strap to hold the PlayStation Move in place when doing the leg exercises. Some players have fashioned alternative leg straps from materials such as rubber bands, masking tape, or twine.

The player sets up their account using their height and weight and fitness level during a sequence called "The Official Weigh In with Dana White". This includes a short fitness test which can be retaken as many times as the player likes. There are workouts under each of the three UFC fighters as well as preset 30 or 60 day workouts. There is also an option to make customized workouts called "The Customized Workout with Dana White".

As the player progresses, there are prizes and trophies they earn and instructional and motivational videos that they unlock. There are also separate activities they can choose for fun or as a break from their work out.

The player doesn't need to be a gamer to use this program and it can be used by all genders, fitness levels, heights, weights, and more.

Development

Reception

The game received "mixed or average reviews" on all platforms according to the review aggregation website Metacritic. A GameSpot review said the Xbox 360 version offers the most exhausting workout in video games, but bugs, repetitive programmes, and overlong stretching periods cause the player to tire for the wrong reasons.

References

External links

2011 video games
Kinect games
Xbox 360 games
PlayStation 3 games
PlayStation Move-compatible games
Wii games
Ultimate Fighting Championship video games
THQ games
Video games developed in the United States